Federal Route 237, or Jalan Chukai-Air Putih (formerly Terengganu State Route T8), is a federal road in Terengganu, Malaysia. It is also a main route to East Coast Expressway via Chukai Interchange

The Kilometre Zero of the Federal Route 237 is at Chukai.

Features
At most sections, the Federal Route 237 was built under the JKR R5 road standard, allowing maximum speed limit of up to 90 km/h.

List of junctions and towns

References

Malaysian Federal Roads